Brandon Montez Lang (born June 18, 1986 in Tucker, Georgia) is a gridiron football defensive end. He attended Troy University, where he graduated from in 2010. After going undrafted in the 2010 NFL Draft, he signed as an undrafted free agent with the San Diego Chargers., and then was signed by the Edmonton Eskimos on September 25, 2012.

He was also a member of the Orlando Predators.

High school career
Lang attended Tucker High School in Georgia, where he helped his team to a 34-4 record over three seasons while playing both tight end and defensive end. Lang was twice named both first-team All-State (AJC) and All-Region. As a defensive player, he recorded 290 career tackles including 71 sacks. He was also credited with 18 career fumble recoveries and 122 tackles for loss.

He initially committed to play football at Georgia, but instead attended Hargrave Military Academy. Considered a four-star recruit by Rivals.com, Lang was ranked 10th among prep school prospects in 2005. It has been reported by NFL blogger Gil Brant that Lang signed with the San Diego Chargers as an undrafted free agent shortly after the draft.

College career
In 2006, he committed to Troy and became part of the defensive line rotation as a freshman. In 2007, Lang started three games before a knee injury ended his season. In 2008, Lang was rated as the Sun Belt Conference's top NFL Draft prospect by Sporting News.

During the 2008 season, Lang earned 9 sacks and 56 tackles over the 13 game season. Following the year, he was named to the top 100 returning players in college football, ranking at  number 84.

Professional career

San Diego Chargers
Shortly after going undrafted in 2010, Lang signed with the San Diego Chargers as a free agent.  He was released by the Chargers on November 22, 2010, but later re-signed. He was released again on July 28, 2011.

Orlando Predators
Lang was signed by the Arena Football League team, the Orlando Predators on December 6, 2011.

Edmonton Eskimos
Lang was signed by the Edmonton Eskimos on September 25, 2012.

Ottawa Redblacks
Lang was signed by the Ottawa Redblacks on February 13, 2014.
Lang was released by the Ottawa Redblacks on October 14, 2014.

References

External links
Ottawa Redblacks player bio 
Official bio at Troy
Official Bio in San Diego

1986 births
Living people
American football defensive ends
American football linebackers
Edmonton Elks players
Orlando Predators players
Ottawa Redblacks players
Players of American football from Georgia (U.S. state)
San Diego Chargers players
Sportspeople from DeKalb County, Georgia
Troy Trojans football players
People from Tucker, Georgia
Tucker High School alumni
Hargrave Military Academy alumni